Yemi Odubade (born 4 July 1984) is a Nigerian footballer who plays as a striker for Southern League Premier Division club Gosport Borough.

Odubade began his football career in England, playing in the Sussex County League for Eastbourne Town in 2002, where he scored over 70 times in two seasons at the East Sussex club in all competitions. This attracted transfer interest from Yeovil Town, signing for the club in July 2004. At Yeovil, Odubade found first-team opportunities limited and left the club in February 2005 in order to join Eastbourne Borough. The following season, Odubade impressed Oxford United manager Brian Talbot in two FA Cup ties whilst playing for Eastbourne Borough, and he joined the League Two club two months later for a fee of £25,000. He spent three-and-a-half years at Oxford, playing 149 games.

Odubade joined Stevenage on a free transfer in May 2009, and helped Stevenage earn promotion to the Football League for the first time in the club's history, finishing as the club's top goalscorer during the season. In January 2011, Odubade signed for Newport County on loan, before joining Conference Premier club Gateshead on a free transfer in June 2011. After spending two years at Gateshead, during which he spent a brief spell on loan at Forest Green Rovers, he then joined Eastleigh in May 2013. He spent three years at Eastleigh, helping the club win the Conference South in his first season. In September 2016, Odubade signed for Maidstone United of the National League and spent one year there before making a return to Eastbourne Borough in July 2017.

An initial loan move to Weymouth in December 2018 was made permanent a month later, as the club secured the Southern League Premier South title in his first season there. After helping Weymouth earn promotion into the National League during the 2019–20 season, he signed for Salisbury in September 2020. His first season at Salisbury was curtailed due to restrictions associated with the COVID-19 pandemic, before playing for the club during the first half of the 2021–22 season. A transfer to Dorchester Town followed in February 2022, where he spent the remainder of that season. Odubade signed for AFC Totton of the Southern League Division One South ahead of the 2022–23 season.

Early life
Odubade was born in Lagos, Nigeria, but moved to England at a young age and grew up in East Sussex. He attended The Bishop Bell School in Eastbourne.

Career

Early career
Odubade began his football career in England, playing in the Sussex County League for Eastbourne Town in 2002. He scored over 70 times in two seasons at the East Sussex club in all competitions, before attracting the attention of Yeovil Town manager Gary Johnson ahead of the 2004–05 season. He subsequently joined the club on a one-year contract on 29 July 2004 after a successful trial. He made his debut as a substitute for Yeovil in a 4–3 defeat against Torquay United in the Football League Trophy on 28 September 2004. Odubade made his second Yeovil appearance in a 3–1 victory away at Histon in an FA Cup tie on 4 December 2004, scoring his only goal for the club in injury-time. He made a further four appearances for the club, before leaving Yeovil on 9 February 2005 due to personal reasons, and subsequently joined Conference South club Eastbourne Borough two days later. Odubade made his Eastbourne Borough debut in the club's 2–0 victory against Basingstoke Town three days after signing for the club, playing 45 minutes of the match. Odubade scored five goals in his first three games for Eastbourne, as he scored a hat-trick in the club's 4–0 home victory against Thurrock on 19 February 2005. He scored his last goal of the season in Eastbourne's 3–0 away win against Cambridge City in the play-off semi-finals on 7 May 2005, and was in the team that lost 2–1 to Altrincham in the final. Odubade made 17 appearances for Eastbourne during the second half of the 2004–05 season, scoring 13 times.

Odubade opted to stay at Eastbourne Borough ahead of the 2005–06 season, and subsequently started in the club's first game of the season, scoring the only goal of the game in a 1–0 away win against Bishop's Stortford. After scoring three goals in the club's first five matches of the season, Odubade did not score again until November 2005 – scoring Eastbourne's goal in a 1–1 draw against Carshalton Athletic on 8 November 2005. Odubade made an impact in the club's FA Cup run during the same season, helping Eastbourne take Oxford United to a replay in November 2005. After impressing Oxford manager Brian Talbot in the two ties, Odubade joined Oxford two months later for a fee of £25,000, on an 18-month contract, on 27 January 2006. On joining Oxford, Odubade said "It brings a tear to my eye just the thought of leaving Eastbourne. But I wanted to get back into the Football League and I just feel I am very lucky to have this second chance". In total, Odubade played 40 times for Eastbourne Borough in all competitions, scoring 20 goals.

Oxford United
Odubade made his debut a day after signing for the club, starting in a 3–0 defeat against Rushden & Diamonds at Nene Park, but was substituted after just 33 minutes with Rushden three goals ahead. He scored his first goal for Oxford in a 2–1 loss away to Wycombe Wanderers on 25 February 2006, having been substituted onto the pitch at half-time. Odubade played eight games throughout Oxford's 2005–06 season, scoring once, as the club were relegated to the Conference National.

Under the new management of Jim Smith, Odubade started the 2006–07 season by appearing as a 60th-minute substitute in Oxford's 2–0 win against Halifax Town. Odubade came on as a half-time substitute against Dagenham & Redbridge on 15 August 2006, and scored the only goal of the game in the 57th minute. Odubade's first 15 appearances of the 2006–07 season were made as a substitute, and he started his first game of the season in Oxford's 1–1 draw against Altrincham on 14 October 2006. A week later, he was in the starting line-up once more, scoring twice in Oxford's 3–0 win against Cambridge United at the Abbey Stadium. A brace against Dagenham & Redbridge in a 2–2 draw on 26 March 2007 took Odubade's tally to 10 goals for the season. Oxford failed to gain promotion back to the Football League after losing on penalties to Exeter City in the play-offs, with Odubade scoring and assisting a goal during the two ties. He was voted Oxford's Player of the Year at the end of the season. Odubade scored 12 goals in 46 games during the season.

He started in Oxford's first game of the 2007–08 season, a 1–0 home win against Forest Green Rovers, coming on at half-time. He scored his first goal of the season in the club's 2–1 away win at the Pirelli Stadium against Burton Albion on 19 August 2007, latching onto Eddie Odhiambo's cross to score from six yards. Odubade scored twice as Oxford raced into a three-goal lead against Torquay United on 11 October 2007 in an eventual 3–3 draw. Having not played in the first-team for three months, he was transfer-listed by manager Darren Patterson on 18 March 2008. Shortly after Odubade had been transfer-listed, Patterson stated that he had played his last game for the club, saying "I think the best thing for him and us is that we go our separate ways". However, just a week later, Odubade was told by Patterson that he "must start producing performances" if he wants to be taken off the transfer list. He was taken off the transfer list after scoring three goals in four games at the end of the season. Patterson said that Odubade was removed from the transfer list because "he's now putting in a shift" every game. He finished the season as Oxford's top goalscorer.
 Odubade played 43 games in all competitions, scoring 11 times as Oxford finished in ninth place.

Odubade scored his first goal of the 2008–09 season against Kettering Town on 6 September 2008, coming on as a 64th-minute substitute and scoring eight minutes later from close range. He scored in a 3–0 win against Barrow on 14 February 2009, in what turned out to be his final goal for Oxford. Odubade played mainly off the substitutes' bench during the latter stages of the season, although did start in the final game of the season as Oxford lost 2–1 against Northwich Victoria on 26 April 2009. He scored seven times in 46 appearances, 25 games of which were as a substitute. In April 2009, new manager Chris Wilder opted not to renew Odubade's contract at the Kassam Stadium due to "the financial terms in his contract", as well as him playing a peripheral role during the 2008–09 season, and the player was told he was allowed to leave the club on a free transfer. During his three and a half-year tenure at Oxford, Odubade made 149 appearances, scoring 33 goals.

Stevenage
Odubade signed for Conference Premier club Stevenage on a free transfer on 14 May 2009. He made his debut for the club as a substitute in Stevenage's 1–1 draw with Tamworth in the opening game of the 2009–10 season on 8 August 2009. Odubade scored his first goal for the club in a 2–1 defeat against his former employers, Oxford United, scoring from close range. Throughout November 2009, Odubade became a regular first-team starter in the Stevenage squad, scoring twice in games against Gateshead and Chester City respectively. He also scored the club's solitary goal in a 2–1 defeat against Ebbsfleet United on 2 December 2009, a game in which he was injured and was subsequently substituted at half-time. Odubade then returned to first-team action on Boxing Day to score a penalty against Cambridge United, as well as assisting the third goal in a 3–1 victory. He scored one and assisted two other goals in the reverse fixture at Broadhall Way six days later, in a 4–1 win. A brace against Mansfield Town on 9 February 2010 ensured his goal tally reached double figures in his first season at the club, helping the club come from a goal behind to win 3–1. A month later, he scored a hat-trick in a 4–0 home victory against Barrow. Odubade played 47 times during his first season at Stevenage, scoring 16 times and finished the season as the club's top goalscorer – a season in which the club won promotion to the Football League for the first time in their history after finishing as Conference Premier champions.

Odubade played in the club's first ever Football League match at the start of the 2010–11 season, coming on as a 60th-minute substitute in a 2–2 draw with Macclesfield Town on 7 August 2010. Odubade scored his first goal of the season in the club's 1–1 home draw against Crewe Alexandra on 4 September 2010, scoring from close range to give Stevenage the lead. In January 2011, Odubade went on loan to Conference Premier club Newport County until the end of the 2010–11 season. He made his Newport debut in the club's televised 3–3 away draw against Mansfield Town on 12 February 2011, coming on as an 82nd-minute substitute in the match. Odubade made his first start for Newport in a 2–2 away draw against Bath City on 22 February 2011, scoring the club's first goal after 14 minutes. It was to be Odubade's only goal for Newport in the eleven appearances he made for the club, seven of which were as a substitute. He returned to his parent club on 17 May 2011.

Gateshead
Having been released by Stevenage at the end of the 2010–11 season, Odubade signed for Conference Premier club Gateshead on 7 June 2011. He joined Gateshead on a free transfer, signing for the club alongside Eddie Odhiambo; the two had previously played alongside each other at Oxford United, Stevenage and Newport County. On joining Gateshead, Odubade said "I have parted company with Stevenage on good terms and this is now a new chapter for me. Gateshead is a good club that is moving in the right direction and I'm sure we can kick on next season. I don't look back with any regrets as things happen for a reason. I am always looking forward. Gateshead is a new challenge for me and I can only see good things coming from it". He made his Gateshead debut on 13 August 2011 in the club's 3–2 away win against Kidderminster Harriers at Aggborough, assisting Kris Gate's goal in the 80th minute. Odubade scored his first goal for Gateshead three days later at Gateshead International Stadium in Gateshead's 3–0 win against Mansfield Town, which was voted Goal of the Season in the club's end of season awards. His first season at Gateshead was disrupted by two foot injuries midway through the season, with Odubade breaking his metatarsal bone on two occasions. Odubade made 34 appearances throughout the season, scoring seven times. He signed a one-year contract extension with Gateshead in May 2012.

Having appeared 24 times for Gateshead during the first half of the 2012–13 season, of which eight were as a substitute, Odubade was loaned to Conference Premier club Forest Green Rovers on 17 January 2013, for the remainder of the season. He made his debut on 19 January as a second-half substitute against Stockport County, a game in which Forest Green lost 2–1. Odubade scored his first goal for Forest Green on 12 March 2013 in a 2–1 win over Southport. It proved to be his only goal during his time at Forest Green, making 14 appearances, all of which were in the league. Odubade returned to Gateshead following the conclusion of the 2012–13 season, and was one of seven players released by the club on 25 April 2013.

Eastleigh
Following his release from Gateshead, Odubade joined Conference South club Eastleigh on a free transfer on 31 May 2013. On signing Odubade, Eastleigh manager Richard Hill stated – "I was impressed with his own personal ambition and his desire to be successful and Yemi opted to sign for Eastleigh as he wants to be with a club that hold the same ambitions". Odubade made his Eastleigh debut in the club's first match of the 2013–14 season, scoring the only goal of the game in a 1–0 victory over Sutton United on 17 August 2013. He went on to score eight times in 39 appearances during the season as Eastleigh won promotion to the Conference Premier after finishing the season as Conference South champions.

During the first half of the 2014–15 season, Odubade made 18 appearances, of which 16 were from the substitutes' bench, for newly promoted Eastleigh without registering a goal. He joined fellow Conference Premier club Woking on loan on 31 January 2015, on an agreement until 25 April 2015. He made his Woking debut, on the same day his signing was announced, as a substitute, in a 3–0 win over Alfreton Town. Odubade scored his first goal in the club's next match, a late consolation goal as Woking lost 2–1 at Barnet. He became a regular starter during the loan spell, scoring seven times in 14 appearances as Woking finished outside of the play-off positions by three points. Odubade returned to Eastleigh at the end of April 2015, and played in both of the club's play-off semi-final matches, scoring in the first leg in an eventual 2–1 defeat to Grimsby Town. Having been out of favour for much of the previous season, Odubade played regularly for Eastleigh during the 2015–16 season and scored seven times in 44 appearances. He made just two appearances in the opening month of the 2016–17 season under new manager Ronnie Moore, and, on 9 September 2016, he left the club by mutual consent.

Maidstone United
Following his departure from Eastleigh, Odubade signed for National League club Maidstone United on 17 September 2016. He made his debut on the same day his signing was announced, as a 73rd-minute substitute in a 1–1 draw with Guiseley. Odubade made his first start a week later, and scored twice in a 3–2 victory against Torquay United. Odubade scored an injury-time winning goal in a 1–0 victory against Boreham Wood on 17 April 2017, a goal that ultimately secured Maidstone's survival in the National League. Odubade scored six times in 35 appearances in all competitions during the season. He discussed the possibility of remaining at Maidstone with manager Jay Saunders, who praised Odubade's attitude and work-rate, but it was mutually agreed that the player would leave the club with Odubade wanting to move to a club closer to where he lived.

Return to Eastbourne Borough
Ahead of the 2017–18 season, on 21 July 2017, Odubade rejoined National League South club Eastbourne Borough. Odubade made his second debut at Eastbourne Borough in the club's first game of the season, scoring the first goal of the match in an eventual 3–2 home defeat to Braintree Town. He played 33 times during his first season back at Eastbourne and scored nine goals as the club finished in 18th place, four points above the relegation places. Odubade remained at Eastbourne for the first half of the 2018–19 season, although was predominantly used as a substitute with 14 of his 18 appearances coming from the substitutes' bench, scoring three goals.

Weymouth
Having been limited to substitute appearances at Eastbourne for the first half of the season, Odubade was loaned to Southern League Premier South club Weymouth on an initial one-month deal on 8 December 2018. He made his debut in a 4–0 win over Frome Town on the same day his signing was announced, and scored his first goal for the club three days later in a 3–1 defeat to Gosport Borough. Odubade was praised by manager Mark Molesley for his performances during the loan spell and he went on to score three goals in seven appearances during the month. Following the conclusion of the loan agreement, Odubade joined the club on a permanent basis on 9 January 2019 after Weymouth supporters helped fund his contract extension for the remainder of the season. Odubade played regularly during the second half of the season, scoring eight times in 29 matches, including in the final game of the season as Weymouth secured the Southern League Premier South title after beating Farnborough 3–0 on 27 April 2019. Odubade described the goal as one of the most important goals of his career.

He scored ten times in 36 appearances in Weymouth's first season back in the National League South. The season was suspended in March 2020 due to the COVID-19 pandemic and the play-off positions were decided on a points-per-game basis, with Weywmouth qualifying for the National League South play-off semi-finals after finishing in third place in the league standings. After entering the pitch as an 83rd-minute substitute in the club's play-off semi-final match against Dorking Wanderers on 25 July 2020, Odubade scored a 95th-minute injury-time winning goal to give Weymouth a 3–2 victory. Weymouth won promotion to the National League after defeating Dartford on a penalty shoot-out in the play-off final on 1 August 2020, with Odubade coming on as an 85th-minute substitute in the match. He was released by Weymouth on 7 September 2020, with the club stating Odubade would "be forever etched in the club's history for scoring two of the most important goals in their history".

Salisbury
After leaving Weymouth, Odubade signed for Southern League Premier South club Salisbury on 13 September 2020. He made one appearance for Salisbury during the 2020–21 season, in a 6–0 victory over Tiverton Town in the FA Trophy on 31 October 2020, before Salisbury's season was ultimately curtailed due to restrictions associated with the COVID-19 pandemic.

Dorchester Town
On 5 February 2022, Odubade signed for Southern League Premier Division South side Dorchester Town.

AFC Totton
On 22 July 2022, Odubade signed for Southern League Division One South club AFC Totton.

Gosport Borough
On 17 February 2023, Odubade signed for Southern League Premier Division club Gosport Borough.

Style of play
Odubade is generally deployed as a striker, but has also been used as a winger. He believes that his best asset is his turn of pace, and that he is at his most dangerous when he is "running at opposition defences". He is predominantly right-footed, and scores the majority of his goals with his right foot, but is also comfortable using his left.

During his time at Stevenage, manager Graham Westley used Odubade as the second striker as part of a 4–4–2 formation sitting off the shoulder of the centre forward. Westley has also used him as part of a 4–3–3 formation, usually on the right side of a three-pronged attack. Odubade has been described as possessing "blistering pace", which was emphasised following two goals away at Crawley Town in March 2010, whereby his pace left the Crawley defence "in their tracks". Former Oxford United manager Darren Patterson said that Odubade needs "to work on his movement up front, and he's got to realise what his assets are and play to them".

Career statistics

A.  The "Other" column constitutes appearances and goals (including those as a substitute) in the FA Trophy, Football League Trophy, Conference League Cup, Sussex Senior Challenge Cup and play-offs.

Honours
Eastbourne Town
 Sussex County League Division Two runner-up: 2002–03
 Sussex County League Division Two Cup runner-up: 2001–02

Stevenage
 Conference Premier: 2009–10; 
FA Trophy runner-up: 2009–10

Eastleigh
 Conference South: 2013–14

Weymouth
 Southern League Premier South: 2018–19
 National League South play-offs: 2019–20

Individual
Oxford United Player of the Season: 2006–07

References

External links

1984 births
Living people
Sportspeople from Lagos
Nigerian footballers
Association football forwards
Eastbourne Town F.C. players
Yeovil Town F.C. players
Eastbourne Borough F.C. players
Oxford United F.C. players
Stevenage F.C. players
Newport County A.F.C. players
Gateshead F.C. players
Forest Green Rovers F.C. players
Eastleigh F.C. players
Woking F.C. players
Maidstone United F.C. players
Weymouth F.C. players
Salisbury F.C. players
Dorchester Town F.C. players
A.F.C. Totton players
English Football League players
National League (English football) players
Southern Football League players
Yoruba sportspeople
People educated at Bishop Bell School